John Earl Varey, FBA (26 August 1922 – 28 March 1999) was a British Hispanist. He was the last Principal of Westfield College, University of London from 1984 to 1989.

References 

British Hispanists
Fellows of the British Academy
1922 births
1999 deaths
People from Lancashire
Alumni of Emmanuel College, Cambridge
Royal Air Force officers
Royal Air Force personnel of World War II
Academics of Westfield College